Droptopwop is a commercial mixtape by American rapper Gucci Mane. It was released on May 26, 2017, by GUWOP Enterprises, RBC Records and Atlantic Records. The entire mixtape is produced by Metro Boomin, along with extra production from Southside, London on da Track, DJ Spinz, and Cubeatz. It features guest appearances from Offset, 2 Chainz, Young Dolph, and Rick Ross.

Droptopwop charted at number 12 on the US Billboard 200, and received positive reviews from critics.

Background
After announcing the project in early 2017, Gucci Mane revealed the cover art, track listing and release date two days before its release on May 24, 2017. The album cover is inspired by the cover of the Clipse album Lord Willin' (2002).

Critical reception
 
Droptopwop was met with generally positive reviews. At Metacritic, which assigns a normalized rating out of 100 to reviews from professional publications, the album received an average score of 72, based on six reviews.

Preezy of XXL gave a positive review, stating "Gucci Mane's latest may be business as usual, but Droptopwop gives the customer exactly what they're looking for, which is a tried-and-true art within itself, making it another quality offering in the Atlanta legend's extensive catalog". Aaron McKrell of HipHopDX said, "His penchant for memorable music makes up for a lack of dexterity and gives Droptopwop a strong sense of unique artistry". Paul A. Thompson of Pitchfork wrote positively, "Droptopwop, his full-length collaboration with Metro Boomin, is Gucci's first post-prison project that truly gels. This is thanks in no small part to Metro".

Marshall Gu of Pretty Much Amazing said, "All told, it's another win in both artists' books, but a mild one". In a mixed review, AllMusic's Neil Z. Yeung stated: "Overall, while a worthwhile inclusion in Gucci's catalog, Droptopwop is most likely to be appreciated primarily by the Wop faithful still hungry after a dizzying seven releases within one year." Corrigan B of Tiny Mix Tapes noted, "With the bag secured, Gucci has nearly limitless options to proceed, but he's done little to show that he's interested in them. Droptopwop is a return to form insofar as it is the high point of his post-jail music, but a plateau is a plateau nonetheless".

Rankings

Commercial performance
Droptopwop debuted at number 12 on the US Billboard 200 earning 32,000 album-equivalent units with 8,000 in pure album sales.

Track listing

Charts

Weekly charts

Year-end charts

References

2017 albums
Gucci Mane albums
Albums produced by Cubeatz
Albums produced by London on da Track
Albums produced by Metro Boomin
Albums produced by Southside (record producer)